Aristonicus uprising is a revolt in the Pergamon, which began under the leadership of king Eumenes III, between 133 BC and 129 BC.

Origin of Eumenes III 
Little is known about Eumenes III: he had a brother, Attalus III, who died in 133 BC. e., and Eumenes III was the illegitimate son of King Eumenes II.

Course of the uprising 
After the death of his brother Attalus III in 133 BC. e., Eumenes III was supposed to become the king of Pergamum, but Eudemus from Pergamum appeared out of nowhere and declared that Attalus III had named him the next king of Pergamum in his will. Aristonikus was very offended by this, and therefore he decided to take power by force. At first, Aristonicus seized power in the coastal city of Levki [en] (between Smyrna and Phocaea), later he adopted the proud name of his father Eumenes III and began to seize power in cities that did not obey him. Further events are described by Strabo:Subsequently, Aristonicus managed to win a number of lightning victories over Rome and its allies, the most vivid of which is mentioned by many ancient historians: the same Strabo, Plutarch, but the most detailed victory over Publius Licinius Crassus was described by Eutropius:Having learned about the failure of Crassus, in 130 BC. the consul Mark Perperna went to correct the situation and did it very successfully: having gathered an army, he landed in Asia Minor and unexpectedly attacked Aristonicus, defeating his army. Aristonicus had no choice but to flee to the city of Stratonicea.

The liberation of cities and territories previously captured by Aristonik began. The Roman army dealt with the rebels particularly cruelly: they poisoned water and food, the Romans tortured and then killed the prisoners. And under this pressure, Aristonik surrendered. He was sent to Rome, where he was strangled in prison. However, without Aristonikus, his small troops fought against the Roman army for one more year: in 129 BC. the Roman army under the leadership of the consul Manius Aquilius finally destroyed the remnants of the rebel units. A loyal friend of Aristonikus, Blossius could not survive the loss of his friend and ended his life by suicide.

References

Works cited
 
 
 
 

Roman Republican civil wars
Slave rebellions